The 1970 Senior League World Series took place from August 17–23 in Gary, Indiana, United States. West Tampa, Florida defeated Throggs Neck, New York in the championship game.

This year featured the debut of the Caribbean region.

Teams

Results

Winner's Bracket

Loser's Bracket

Elimination Round

References

Senior League World Series
Senior League World Series
Baseball competitions in Indiana
Sports in Gary, Indiana
1970 in sports in Indiana